The 1988 Temple Owls football team was an American football team that represented Temple University as an independent during the 1988 NCAA Division I-A football season. In its sixth and final season under head coach Bruce Arians, the team compiled a 4–7 record and was outscored by a total of 317 to 207. The team played its home games at Veterans Stadium in Philadelphia. 

The team's statistical leaders included Matt Baker with 1,539 passing yards, Todd McNair with 761 rushing yards, Mike Palys with 517 receiving yards, and placekicker Bill Wright with 55 points scored.

Schedule

References

Temple
Temple Owls football seasons
Temple Owls football